Bogatyrka may refer to:

 A female bogatyr, a Russian folk hero
 An earlier name of Russian military hat budenovka